Cardiff City Football Club is a professional association football club based in Cardiff, Wales. The club was founded in 1899 as Riverside A.F.C., by members of a local cricket club, and joined the Cardiff & District League the following year. In 1907, they joined the South Wales Amateur League and changed their name to Cardiff City, later entering the English football pyramid by joining the Southern Football League in 1910. They were elected into the Football League ten years later, where they remain to this day. As of the end of the 2017–18 season, the club has won 3 division titles in the Football League, won promotion on 13 occasions and been relegated 12 times.

All players who have featured in 100 or more first-team matches in all competitions for the club since they joined the English football pyramid in 1910, either as a member of the starting eleven or as a substitute, are listed below. Billy Hardy is the current holder of appearance records in both league matches and all competitions having made 590 appearances in a 20-year spell at the club between 1911 and 1932. Phil Dwyer has made the most appearances for the club in the Football League era, having made 575 appearances between 1972 and 1985. Only nine players have made more than 400 appearances for the club, three of which, Dwyer, Fred Keenor and Ron Stitfall were born and raised in Cardiff. The most recent player to reach 400 appearances for the club is Peter Whittingham.

The all-time goalscoring record is held by Len Davies, who had a twelve-year spell at Cardiff between 1919 and 1931, scoring 179 times. Seven other players have scored 100 goals or more for the club. Robert Earnshaw is the most recent player to reach the mark and also holds the club record for goals in a single season, scoring 35 during 2002–03. Midfielder Aron Gunnarsson holds the record for the most international caps won during his spell at the club having represented Iceland 60 times.

Key
The list is ordered by alphabetical order of surname.
Appearances as a substitute are included. This feature of the game was introduced in the Football League at the start of the 1965–66 season.
Statistics are correct as of the match played on 7 May 2022.

List

Notes

References
General

 

Specific

Players
 
Cardiff City F.C.
Players
Association football player non-biographical articles